Silver Birch, Blood Moon is an anthology of fantasy stories edited by Terri Windling and Ellen Datlow.  It is one of a series of anthologies edited by the pair centered on re-told fairy tales. It was published by Avon Books in May 1999. The anthology contains, among several other stories, the Pat York short story "You Wandered Off Like a Foolish Child To Break Your Heart and Mine", which was original to the anthology and was nominated for a Nebula Award for Best Short Story. The anthology itself won the 2000 World Fantasy Award for Best Anthology.

Contents

 Introduction (Silver Birch, Blood Moon), by Terri Windling and Ellen Datlow
 "Kiss Kiss", by Tanith Lee
 "Carabosse", by Delia Sherman
 "The Price", by Patricia Briggs
 "Glass Coffin", by Caitlín R. Kiernan
 "The Vanishing Virgin", by Harvey Jacobs
 "Clad in Gossamer", by Nancy Kress
 "Precious", by Nalo Hopkinson
 "The Sea Hag", by Melissa Lee Shaw
 "The Frog Chauffeur", by Garry Kilworth
 "The Dybbuk in the Bottle", by Russell William Asplund
 "The Shell Box", by Karawynn Long
 "Ivory Bones", by Susan Wade
 "The Wild Heart", by Anne Bishop
 "You Wandered Off Like a Foolish Child to Break Your Heart and Mine", by Pat York
 "Arabian Phoenix", by India Edghill
 "Toad-Rich", by Michael Cadnum
 "Skin So Green and Fine", by Wendy Wheeler
 "The Willful Child, the Black Dog, and the Beanstalk", by Melanie Tem
 "Locks", by Neil Gaiman
 "Marsh-Magic", by Robin McKinley
 "Toad", by Patricia A. McKillip
 "Recommended Reading (Silver Birch, Blood Moon), by Ellen Datlow and Terri Windling

Reprints
Prime Books, November 2008.
Open Road Integrated Media, September 2014 ebook.

References

1999 anthologies
Fantasy anthologies
Collections of fairy tales
Avon (publisher) books